Beto Avila may refer to:

Bobby Ávila (1924–2004), Mexican baseball player
Beto Avila (soccer) (born 2000), American soccer player
Estadio de Béisbol Beto Ávila, baseball venue in Mexico
Estadio Universitario Beto Ávila, baseball venue in Mexico